Two submarines of the United States Navy have been named USS Seal for the seal, a marine mammal.

 , the first submarine built for the Navy by Simon Lake, was renamed G-1.
 , a Salmon-class submarine that served before and during the early years of World War II.

United States Navy ship names